The Chariot of Wisdom and Love was the second newspaper written and published by 19th-century reformer Jeremiah Hacker of Portland, Maine. Published between the years of 1864 and 1866, The Chariot of Wisdom and Love was a Spiritualist reform journal. The newspaper came to an end after the Great Fire destroyed much of the city of Portland on July 4, 1866. Soon after this event Hacker left Portland to retire in Vineland, NJ.

References 

Defunct newspapers published in Maine
Publications established in 1864
Publications disestablished in 1866